Mother Juan Aviance (born 1963 in Charleston, South Carolina) is an American secretary, voguer / dancer,  music artist, nightclub host / promoter, record label owner, and CEO / A&R. He is the founder and "Mother" of the House of Aviance, one of the legendary houses that emerged from the U.S. ball culture in the 1980s, a House which is still active today and "currently reigns the club scene in New York City." He is also founder, CEO and A&R of Aviance Records, LLC, a multi-genre record label that promotes new and upcoming artists. He is regarded as a "legend / icon" within the ballroom scene and is "House Mother" to the nightlife personalities and recording artists Kevin Aviance, and Erickatoure Aviance.

As an artist and host / promoter, Mother Juan has worked with several high-profile singers, music producers, DJs, and film directors over the years, some of which include Janet Jackson, Ce Ce Peniston, Madonna, Junior Vasquez, Tony Moran and Wolfgang Busch.

Early life and education
Aviance was born in 1963 in Charleston, South Carolina and raised in Boston. From his school days up to his teenage years, he participated in performing arts activities such as dance and music but chose not to pursue a career in the performing arts because he disliked the repetitiveness of it, especially dance.

In 1982 he graduated from high school and progressed into business school in order to acquire office skills. Mother Juan's background / schooling in business and dance is a key factor in the success of the House of Aviance, a vogue ball house which he would go on to create in 1989.

Career

Outside ballroom culture
Whilst at business school, Aviance worked for the Boston Public Schools as a clerk and then moved on to "The State of Massachusetts Disability" doing the same role.

In 1987, Aviance moved from  Boston to Washington, DC and landed a job with an environmental lobbyist doing paralegal work and setting up press conferences with senators on Capitol Hill.

Within ball culture and the entertainment industry

In August 1989, Aviance founded the House of Aviance which is now one of the "legendary" ballroom houses to have emerged from African-American LGBT ball culture. The Legendary House of Aviance is known for its voguers, dancers, performances, runways, fashion, music, music producers and DJs, and "currently reigns the club scene in New York City." As of 2014, its membership is just over 700 worldwide and include dancers, musicians, DJs, drag queens, performing artists, visual artists, singers, songwriters, music producers and engineers. Since its founding, Aviance has been the "House Mother", and Daddy Tony Aviance the "House Father". 
According to Aviance, some of the key reasons for starting the House was because of his "love for the arts" and his leadership skills as stated below:

Some notable House members include the nightlife personalities and entertainers Kevin Aviance ("oldest house daughter" or "first big daughter" of Mother Juan), and Erickatoure Aviance. DJs/Producers Jean-Philippe Aviance and Nita Aviance (a former dancer); and dancer Tamsier Joof Aviance.

As an artist and nightlife host/promoter, Aviance has gone on to work with several high-profile singers, music producers, DJs, and film directors over the years, some of which include Janet Jackson, Ce Ce Peniston, Madonna, Kevin Aviance, Bette Midler, Cyndi Lauper, Jennifer Hudson, Mariah Carey, Willi Ninja (the voguing icon and founder of the House of Ninja), Junior Vasquez, Tony Moran and Wolfgang Busch (director of the 2006 documentary How Do I Look).

As House Mother

Historically, the "Mother" of a ballroom house was usually a drag queen or a transgender woman. As such, Aviance was initially hesitant to assume the role of House Mother but ultimately decided to take up the role. His style of "mothering" is somewhat business-like, having attended business and dance school. Although this style is pivotal in the success of the House, he is also very protective towards his "house children", and was instrumental in removing the House of Aviance from walking balls in order to protect his children from what he deemed as "Ballroom politics", abuse, and unfair judging—despite the House winning numerous trophies and cash prizes over the years in ballroom competitions.

Aviance has also been instrumental and supportive in the professional careers of many of his children, some of which included the careers of Kevin Aviance, Erickatoure Aviance and DJ/Producer Jean-Philippe Aviance.

In the 1980s, Aviance spearheaded a weekly nightlife event in Washington, D.C. called Kindergarten Parties.  These parties where frequented by New York City's Club Kids such as Amanda Lepore, James St. James and Kenny Kenny. Other patrons included Kevin Aviance (who later became a House Member) and several other nightlife personalities. These Kindergarten Parties propelled the careers of many high-profile artists within the LGBT community including Kevin Aviance and Jean-Philippe Aviance (the House of Aviance's first DJ) who used to DJ for Mother Juan at the former Vault Nightclub in D.C. where these weekly parties were held.

In January 2014, Aviance celebrated his 50th birthday with several House of Aviance DJs and House members in attendance. The event was hosted by Aviance's eldest daughter Kevin Aviance, with special guests including singer, DJ, fashion icon and former Deee-Lite vocalist Lady Miss Kier among other nightlife personalities.

Aviance is regarded as one of the living "legends / icons" within the ballroom scene with one of the longest continuously active ballroom houses that has won numerous competition cash prizes and trophies over the years. He is one of the longest serving and continuously active house parents in the history of ball culture having ruled the House for 33 years as of 2022, surpassing the record of the late icon Pepper LaBeija who ruled the Legendary House of LaBeija for nearly 32 years without interruption. On 23 March 2014, Aviance partnered with fellow House member David Ohana and founded Aviance Records - a multi-genre record label that promotes new and upcoming artists. Some high-profile House members and none-House members have released tracks through this record label including Erickatoure Aviance with her 2017 track OVAH—with the official video first showcased on Jonny McGovern's Hey Qween Channel on 26 June 2017.

See also

 LGBT culture in New York City
 List of LGBT people from New York City

Notes and references

External links
The House of Aviance official website 
The House of Aviance and Aviance Record's official blog 
Mother Juan Aviance's official YouTube Channel capturing The House of Aviance's performances and events over the years  
Aviance Records, LLC official website 
Aviance Records, LLC official YouTube Channel 

1963 births
House of Aviance
Living people
Nightlife in New York City
African-American musicians
LGBT African Americans
People from Charleston, South Carolina
African-American male dancers
African-American dancers
American male dancers
21st-century African-American people
20th-century African-American people